Maestro is a Greek drama television series created for Mega channel by Christoforos Papakaliatis. The series is set in Paxos and revolves around love affairs, family drama, and crime.

References

External links
 

2020s crime drama television series
2020s LGBT-related drama television series
2022 Greek television series debuts
Gay-related television shows
Greek LGBT-related television shows
Television shows filmed in Greece